Glade is an unincorporated community in Fayette County, West Virginia, United States. It was also known as Paw Paw.

The community takes its name from nearby Glade Creek.

References 

Unincorporated communities in West Virginia
Unincorporated communities in Fayette County, West Virginia